Boniface Okafor (born January 15, 1966) is a Nigerian former football (soccer) player.

Okafor attended the University of West Florida where he played soccer from 1988 to 1990. He was a 1990 NAIA Second Team All American. In 2007, Okafor was inducted into the Argonauts Hall of Fame.

In 1990, he played for the London Lasers. In 1992, he signed with the Miami Freedom of the American Professional Soccer League. He played a handful of games before being waived on July 5, 1992. He then played for several teams, including Penang FA in Malaysia, Standard FC in Nigeria and Klagenfurt in Austria.  He eventually settled with Hannover 96 in the Second Bundesliga. On March 4, 1996, the Tampa Bay Mutiny selected Okafor in the third round (twenty-fourth) overall of the 1996 MLS Supplemental Draft. The Mutiny waived him in April.

References

1966 births
Living people
American Professional Soccer League players
Hannover 96 players
Miami Freedom players
Nigerian footballers
Nigerian expatriate footballers
Penang F.C. players
Tampa Bay Mutiny draft picks
West Florida Argonauts men's soccer players
Association football forwards
Nigerian expatriate sportspeople in the United States
Nigerian expatriate sportspeople in Austria
Nigerian expatriate sportspeople in Germany
Nigerian expatriate sportspeople in Malaysia
Expatriate soccer players in the United States
Expatriate footballers in Austria
Expatriate footballers in Germany
Expatriate footballers in Malaysia
London Lasers players